Many variants of xiangqi have been developed over the centuries. A few of these variants are still regularly played, though none are nearly as popular as xiangqi itself.

Two-player variants 
 Congo, invented by Demian Freeling
 Manchu chess, invented by the Bannermen during the Qing dynasty

Three-player variants 
 Game of the Three Friends
 Game of the Three Kingdoms

Seven-player variants 
 Game of the Seven Kingdoms (七国象棋), invented by Sima Guang

See also 
 Chess variant
 List of Janggi variants
 Shogi variant

 
Chinese games